Patrick Sarsfield Donegan (29 October 1923 – 26 November 2000) was an Irish Fine Gael politician who served as Minister for Fisheries from February 1977 to July 1977, Minister for Lands from 1976 to 1977 and Minister for Defence from 1973 to 1976. He served as a Teachta Dála (TD) from 1954 to 1957 and 1961 to 1981. He also served as a Senator for the Agricultural Panel from 1957 to 1961.

He was born on 29 October 1923 at Monasterboice, County Louth, son of Thomas Francis Donegan, a publican and farmer, and Rose Ann Donegan (née Butterly). He was educated at a Christian Brothers School in Drogheda, County Louth and at the Vincentian Castleknock College, Dublin. 

Donegan was elected as a Fine Gael TD for the Louth constituency at the 1954 general election. He lost his seat at the 1957 general election, but was elected to Seanad Éireann as a Senator for the Agricultural Panel. He regained his Dáil seat at the 1961 general election. In the Fine Gael-Labour Party coalition government which took power after the 1973 general election Donegan was appointed as Minister for Defence.

In October 1976, Donegan made a controversial speech on an official visit to the opening of new kitchen facilities in an army barracks at Mullingar, County Westmeath. He described as a "thundering disgrace" President Cearbhall Ó Dálaigh's refusal to sign the Emergency Powers Act, 1976, instead using his powers under Article 26 of the Constitution to refer it to the Supreme Court. The Taoiseach, Liam Cosgrave, refused Donegan's resignation, and instead Ó Dálaigh resigned as President of Ireland. The whole episode badly damaged the government's reputation.

In 1976, Donegan became Minister for Lands, and in 1977, he served briefly as Minister for Fisheries. Donegan retired from politics at the 1981 general election, and died in 2000. He was buried in his home town of Monasterboice, County Louth.

References

 

1923 births
2000 deaths
Fine Gael TDs
Members of the 15th Dáil
Members of the 9th Seanad
Members of the 17th Dáil
Members of the 18th Dáil
Members of the 19th Dáil
Members of the 20th Dáil
Members of the 21st Dáil
People educated at Castleknock College
Irish farmers
Ministers for Defence (Ireland)
Fine Gael senators